Kendrick Lamar is the eponymous debut extended play (EP) by American rapper Kendrick Lamar that was released as a free digital download on December 31, 2009 by Top Dawg Entertainment (TDE). It is his first project to be released under his birth name, previously releasing music under the moniker K.Dot, from 2005 to late 2009. 

The EP features guest appearances from Angela McCluskey, Ab-Soul, JaVonte, Jay Rock, BJ the Chicago Kid, Punch, Schoolboy Q and Big Pooh. The EP's production was handled by Sounwave, Black Milk, Jake One, Q-Tip and Wyldfyer, among others. The free-download EP premiered exclusively on online mixtape distribution platform DatPiff and has since then been downloaded over 200,000 times on the website earning a gold certification status.

Track listing

Sample credits
 "Is It Love" contains a sample of "Don't Look Back", performed by Telepopmusik and Angela McCluskey.
 "P&P" contains a sample of "Clock With No Hands", performed by The Roots & Mercedes Martinez.
 "She Needs Me" contains samples of "Byrdshot and Bye", performed by Dimlite; and "Long Red", performed by Mountain. The song also contains a drum sample from "Let's Ride", performed by Q-Tip.
 "I Am (Interlude)" is a remix of "Believe", performed by Q-Tip & D'Angelo.
 "Wanna Be Heard" is a remix of "Popular Demand", performed and produced by Black Milk.
 "I Do This" contains a sample of "Don't You Want to Stay", performed by Bill Withers.
 "Faith" contains a sample of "Tired of Fighting", performed by Menahan Street Band.
 "Vanity Slaves" is a remix of "Daykeeper", performed by The Foreign Exchange & Muhsinah.
 "Thanksgiving" contains samples of "Almost Like Being in Love" performed by Nat King Cole, and "Long Red", performed by Mountain.
 "Determined" contains samples of "Family", performed by Lamont Dozier, and interpolates "Touch the Sky", performed by Kanye West and Lupe Fiasco.

References

External links 
 

2009 debut EPs
Top Dawg Entertainment albums
Kendrick Lamar albums
Albums free for download by copyright owner
Albums produced by Black Milk
Albums produced by Jake One
Albums produced by Sounwave